The USA Rink Hockey National Championship is the biggest Roller Hockey Clubs Championship in United States. In the U.S., the sport is largely owned by roller rink operators. The sport suffers stateside since players are mostly made up of operator's family members and a gaggle of childhood friends. 
Since the sport transitioned to the United States in the 1960s, teams and players competing in the United States have waned as roller rinks continue to close nationwide. Teams are often completed by tapping skaters from ice or inline hockey who are willing to give it a go and round out teams at U.S. nationals; many playing on inline skates. The sport is struggling in the U.S. due to the lack of public access to the sport found in other countries where the sport continues to grow. In contrast to other countries, the U.S. players and teams are managed and vetted by roller rink operators and their families. This practice explains the recurring players, teams, and regions who compete each year, and the loss of total number of teams since the 1960s and 1970s.

USA National Championship

Participated Teams in the last Season
The clubs that competed in the season of 2019 were: 
 Lubbock Phoenix 
 Bremerton Hurricanes
 United Florida 
 Decatur Knights
 Olympia Warriors
 Merced Screaming eagles
 Bedford Bandits
 North Texas Twisters
 Alaska Snow Devils
 Cumberland raiders
 Bowie marauders
 Ocala Hockey Club
 Salt Lake City 
 Centralia Sharks

List of Winners

Number of Championships by team

See also
News about 2010 US National Roller Hockey in Bremerton

External links

USA websites
USA Roller Sports
USA Rink Hockey
Fort Smith Nighthawks Hockey Club
Roller Land Merced
Roller Land Merced
 Hardballhock USA Rink Hockey Blog
Pheasantland Rolling Phantoms Hockey
Decatur Skate Rink Hockey Club

International
 Roller Hockey links worldwide
 Mundook-World Roller Hockey
Hardballhock-World Roller Hockey
Inforoller World Roller Hockey
 World Roller Hockey Blog
rink-hockey-news - World Roller Hockey

Roller hockey in the United States
Roller
United States